Matthew Murray (born May 25, 1994) is a Canadian professional ice hockey goaltender for the Toronto Maple Leafs of the National Hockey League (NHL). Murray was selected by the Pittsburgh Penguins in the third round (83rd overall) of the 2012 NHL Entry Draft. In 2016, Murray won his first Stanley Cup championship as the starting goaltender for the Penguins during the playoffs after having replaced then-starter Marc-André Fleury. Murray would split the net with Fleury during the 2017 Stanley Cup playoffs, winning the Stanley Cup again in 2017. Murray became the first goaltender to win back-to-back Stanley Cups as a rookie.

Playing career

Early career
Murray was born and raised in Thunder Bay, Ontario and played his minor hockey with the Thunder Bay Minor Hockey Association. He spent his younger years playing AA before moving up to the Thunder Bay Kings AAA program.

In his minor midget season (2009–10), Murray led his Kings to a 3–2–0 record at the OHL Cup. That season with the Kings, Murray appeared in 40 games with a 2.28 GAA and six shutouts. He was subsequently selected in the second round (35th overall) of the 2010 OHL Priority Selection by the Sault Ste. Marie Greyhounds.

Murray played major junior hockey in the Ontario Hockey League with the Sault Ste. Marie Greyhounds. On September 4, 2013, Murray was signed to a three-year entry-level contract with the Pittsburgh Penguins.

Pittsburgh Penguins

During his first full professional season with the Penguins AHL affiliate, the Wilkes-Barre/Scranton Penguins in 2014–15, on March 8, 2015, Murray set an AHL record for the longest shutout streak by not allowing any goals for 304 minutes and 11 seconds. The previous record of 268:17 was held by Barry Brust.

On March 22, Murray recorded his tenth shutout of the season, breaking a record for rookie AHL goaltenders set by Gordie Bell in 1942–43. He would finish the regular season with 12 shutouts. Murray capped his standout rookie season by sweeping the AHL awards, he was selected to the AHL First All-Star Team and Rookie Team, while winning the Baz Bastien Memorial Award as the League's best goaltender and the Dudley "Red" Garrett Memorial Award as best rookie.

In the 2015–16 season, Murray was recalled from the AHL for the first time to the Pittsburgh Penguins on December 15, 2015 and made his NHL debut on December 19, 2015 in a 2–1 loss against the Carolina Hurricanes. Murray was recalled again by the Pittsburgh Penguins on February 21, 2016 and started nine games to finish the season.

On April 19, 2016 the 21-year old Murray made his NHL playoff debut in game three of the first round becoming the youngest goaltender in franchise history to start a post-season game. He allowed just one goal as the Penguins defeated the New York Rangers 3–1. Just two days later, Murray recorded his first NHL playoff shutout in a 5–0 win over the Rangers.

Murray remained the starting goaltender throughout the 2016 playoffs. After being replaced by veteran Marc-André Fleury, who returned from injury in game five of the third round, he started in all remainder games of the 2016 Stanley Cup playoffs. Murray led the Penguins past the San Jose Sharks in the finals to the franchise's fourth Stanley Cup. He posted an impressive .923 save percentage and 2.08 GAA throughout the playoffs and became only the sixth starting rookie goaltender in the Stanley Cup Finals since 1976.

Murray was then re-signed by the Penguins to a three-year contract with an annual average salary of $3.75 million.

To start the 2016–17 season, Murray was injured due to a broken hand sustained during international play. Following his return, he supplanted the veteran Fleury as the Penguins starter, and retained his elite form from his first year. During the season, he recorded 32 wins, a .923 save percentage, 2.41 GAA, and four shutouts. He finished within the top ten of the NHL amongst qualifying goaltenders in wins, save percentage, and shutouts, while finishing 11th in GAA. This elite play allowed Murray to finish fourth in Calder Trophy voting for Rookie of the Year, and earned Murray a spot on the 2016–17 All-Rookie Team and the 2017 NHL All-Playoff Team.

He recorded his first NHL point on December 8, 2016, an assist on an empty net goal.

During warm-ups of game one of the Penguins' first-round matchup versus the Columbus Blue Jackets in the 2017 Stanley Cup playoffs, Murray was injured and Fleury took starting position. He saw his first action of the 2017 Stanley Cup playoffs in game three of the Eastern Conference Finals against the Ottawa Senators after Fleury was pulled. He recorded a shutout two games later, stopping all 25 shots he faced in a 7–0 win. A thrilling game seven overtime win helped Murray and the Penguins reach the Stanley Cup Finals for the second year in a row. Despite two solid starts in the first two games against the Nashville Predators, Murray's game faltered in games three and four. As a result, there were speculations on who would start in the fifth game. Murray was announced as the starter and stopped all 24 shots the Nashville Predators shot at him in a 6–0 win. Murray made 27 saves in game six, shutting out the Predators 2–0 and winning the Stanley Cup for the second consecutive season.

During the 2017–18 NHL season Murray sustained his second concussion during practice. On February 26, 2018, during practice, Murray was struck in the head with a puck shot by teammate and defenseman Olli Maatta and was forced to leave the session early. Murray had previously sustained a concussion in the 2015–16 season causing him to miss the first two games of the playoffs. Matt Murray returned from his February 2018 concussion, as the Penguins' starting goaltender, on March 20, 2018, against the New York Islanders. Murray allowed four goals in the Penguins' 4–1 loss during that game.

Murray recorded the longest playoff shutout streak in Penguins franchise history at 225:49. It started during game four of the 2017 Stanley Cup Finals and ended in game two of the Penguins' 2018 first round series against the Philadelphia Flyers, when Shayne Gostisbehere scored late in the first period. On April 18, 2018, Murray became the fastest goaltender to record 25 playoff wins in the NHL. On April 23, 2018, Murray was nominated for the King Clancy Memorial Trophy as a player who best exemplifies leadership qualities and gives back to in his community. Despite Murrays efforts, Pittsburgh ended up losing to the Washington Capitals in six games in the second round of the playoffs.

Murray was the starting goaltender for the Penguins to begin the 2018–19 season. After starting two games, Murray was diagnosed with a concussion following practice on October 8 and was ruled out indefinitely. He returned to the line-up on October 13 as a backup to Casey DeSmith only to be placed on injured reserve again in November due to a lower body injury.

Murray and the Penguins were swept by the New York Islanders in the first round of the 2019 Stanley Cup playoffs; Murray recorded a 3.01 goals against average for the series.

On October 12, 2019, Murray recorded his 100th NHL win, a 7–4 victory over the Minnesota Wild; he accomplished the feat in only 166 games, tying Pete Peeters for seventh fastest since the 1967 expansion.

Ottawa Senators
On October 7, 2020, as an impending restricted free agent, Murray was traded by the Penguins to the Ottawa Senators in exchange for Jonathan Gruden and a second-round pick in 2020. On October 9, Murray signed a four-year, $25 million contract extension with the Senators.

During his second year under contract, Murray opened the  season by going winless in his opening six appearances. On November 28, 2021, Murray was placed on waivers and later demoted to regain his game with AHL affiliate, the Belleville Senators, the following day after going unclaimed. After two games in Belleville, managing a 1–1–0 record and a .918 save percentage, Murray was recalled to Ottawa to resume duties as starter. His season came to an end on March 4, 2022, after a collision with Senators defenceman Nikita Zaitsev left him with a concussion. In his absence, Anton Forsberg began to establish himself as the team's preferred starting goaltender. The Senators opted to extend Forsberg after the end of the season, fueling speculation that they would look to trade Murray elsewhere. General manager Pierre Dorion first attempted a deal with the Buffalo Sabres, having arranged to send Murray and the seventh overall pick in the 2022 NHL Entry Draft to the Sabres in exchange for the sixteenth overall pick. However, the Sabres had been included on Murray's no-trade list as part of his contract, and he declined to waive it; Ottawa ultimately moved the pick tied to Murray to Chicago in a package deal for Alex DeBrincat.

Toronto Maple Leafs
Shortly after the vetoed trade to the Sabres, rumors began to publicly appear heavily connecting Murray to interest from the rival Toronto Maple Leafs. Ultimately the Senators announced on July 11, 2022, that they had traded Murray to the Maple Leafs, along with a third-round pick in 2023 and a seventh-round pick in 2024, in exchange for future considerations. The Senators also retained 25% of Murray's salary for the remainder of the contract. Leafs general manager Kyle Dubas and coach Sheldon Keefe had both known Murray during his time in the OHL with the Greyhounds, and with Leafs starting goaltender Jack Campbell expected to depart in free agency, they settled on Murray as a replacement.

Murray played the Maple Leafs' season opening game, a 4–3 loss to the Montreal Canadiens on October 12, 2022, but on October 15 he departed the team's morning skate with groin pain. It was subsequently announced that he had suffered an adductor injury and would miss at least four weeks of the regular season. He picked up his first Maple Leafs win on November 15, 2022, a 5–2 win against his former team, the Pittsburgh Penguins  and his first Maple Leafs shutout on December 6 against the Dallas Stars.

International play

Murray represented Team North America at the 2016 World Cup of Hockey, as starting goaltender. On September 19, he broke his hand playing against Russia but went undiagnosed for several days before getting an MRI and confirmed with a broken ligament.

On April 29, 2019, Murray was named as the first choice goaltender to backstop Canada at the 2019 IIHF World Championship held in Slovakia. Recording five wins in seven games, Murray helped Canada progress through to the playoff rounds before losing the final to Finland to finish with the Silver Medal on May 26, 2019.

Personal life
Murray's father, who died in January 2018, was from Scotland and his mother is from the Netherlands. He married his high school sweetheart Christina Sirignano on June 20, 2019.

Career statistics

Regular season and playoffs

International

Awards and honours

References

External links
 

1994 births
Belleville Senators players
Canadian ice hockey goaltenders
Canadian people of Dutch descent
Canadian people of Scottish descent
Ice hockey people from Ontario
Living people
Ottawa Senators players
Pittsburgh Penguins draft picks
Pittsburgh Penguins players
Sault Ste. Marie Greyhounds players
Sportspeople from Thunder Bay
Stanley Cup champions
Toronto Maple Leafs players
Wilkes-Barre/Scranton Penguins players